The Palawanic languages are a subgroup in the Greater Central Philippine-family spoken on the island of Palawan and nearby islets.

Languages

The Palawanic languages are:
Palawano (a dialect cluster)
Aborlan Tagbanwa
Central Tagbanwa (not to be confused with Kalamian Tagbanwa)
Batak (not to be confused with the Batak languages)
Tau't Batu

Molbog may also be in this group, closest to Palawano.

Reconstruction
Proto-Palawanic has been reconstructed by Thiessen (1980).

References

Further reading
Zorc, R. David. (1972a). Palawano Notes.
Zorc, R. David. (1972b). Tagbanwa (Northern) Notes.

 
Greater Central Philippine languages
Languages of Palawan